Monroe Central High School is a public high school in Woodsfield, Ohio, United States.  It is one of three high schools in the Switzerland of Ohio Local School District. Sports teams are called the Seminoles, and they compete in the Ohio High School Athletic Association as a member of the Ohio Valley Athletic Conference and Mid-Ohio Valley League.

Monroe Central High School was established in 1994 with the consolidation of Skyvue High School and Woodsfield High School.

Ohio High School Athletic Association State Championships

 Girls Softball – 2004 
 Boys Baseball* - 1985 

 * Title won by Skyvue High School (Graysville, Ohio) prior to 1994 consolidation into Monroe Central

References

https://web.archive.org/web/20100107014121/http://www.ohiowrestling.net/history/highschool/ohsaa/champs.html

External links
 School Website
 District Website

High schools in Monroe County, Ohio
Public high schools in Ohio
1994 establishments in Ohio